The 2012–13 Luxembourg Cup was the 88th season of Luxembourg's annual football cup competition. It began on 2 September 2012 with Round 1 and ended on 17 May 2013 with the Final. The winners of the competition will qualify for the first qualifying round of the 2013–14 UEFA Europa League. F91 Dudelange are the defending champions, having won their fifth cup title last season.

Calendar

Round 1
34 teams from the 2. Division (IV) and 3. Division (V) entered in this round. The games were played on 2 September 2012.

Bye: Alisontia Steinsel, FC Brouch, CS Bourscheid, Jeunesse Biwer, Les Aiglons Dalheim, Minière Lasauvage, US Moutfort/Medingen, Red Boys Aspelt, Résidence Walferdange, US Reisdorf, CS Sanem, Sporting Bettembourg, Union Mertert/Wasserbillig, Union Remich/Bous, Vinesca Ehnen.

Round 2
The seventeen winners of Round 1 and the fifteen other teams from the 2. Division (IV) and 3. Division (V) competed in this round. The games were played on 16 September 2012.

Round 3
The sixteen winners of Round 2 competed in this round, as well as twenty-eight teams from Division 1 (III), which enter the competition in this round. The games were played on 5 and 7 October 2012.

Round 4
The twenty-two winners of Round 3 competed in this round, as well as fourteen teams from the Division of Honour (II), which enter the competition in this round. The games were played on 27 and 28 October 2012.

Round 5
The eighteen winners of Round 4 compete in this round, as well as the fourteen teams from the National Division (I), which enter the competition in this round. The games are played on 16 and 18 November 2012.

Round 6
The sixteen winners of Round 5 competed in this round. The games were played on 1 and 2 December 2012.

Quarterfinals
The eight winners from Round 6 competed in the quarterfinals. They were held on 1 May 2013.

Semi finals
The four winners from quarterfinals competed in the semifinals. They were held on 8 and 9 May 2013

Final

References

External links
 Official page 
 Private homepage about everything regarding Luxembourg soccer 

Luxembourg Cup seasons
Luxembourg Cup
Cup